The Nakajima A6M2-N (Navy Type 2 Interceptor/Fighter-Bomber) was a single-crew floatplane based on the Mitsubishi A6M Zero Model 11. The Allied reporting name for the aircraft was Rufe.

Design and development

The A6M2-N floatplane was developed from the Mitsubishi A6M Type 0, mainly to support amphibious operations and defend remote bases. It was based on the A6M-2 Model 11 fuselage, with a modified tail and added floats. A total of 327 were built, including the original prototype.

Operational history
The aircraft was deployed in 1942, referred to as the "Suisen 2" ("Hydro fighter type 2"), and was only utilized in defensive actions in the Aleutians and Solomon Islands operations. Such seaplanes were effective in harassing American PT boats at night. They could also drop flares to illuminate the PTs which were vulnerable to destroyer gunfire, and depended on cover of darkness. 

The seaplane also served as an interceptor for protecting fueling depots in Balikpapan and Avon Bases (Dutch East Indies) and reinforced the Shumushu base (North Kuriles) in the same period.  Such fighters served aboard seaplane carriers Kamikawa Maru in the Solomons and Kuriles areas and aboard Japanese raiders Hokoku Maru and Aikoku Maru in Indian Ocean raids.  In the Aleutian Campaign this fighter engaged with RCAF Curtiss P-40 Warhawk, Lockheed P-38 Lightning fighters and Boeing B-17 Flying Fortress bombers. The aircraft was used for interceptor, fighter-bomber, and short reconnaissance support for amphibious landings, among other uses.

Later in the conflict the Otsu Air Group utilized the A6M2-N as an interceptor alongside Kawanishi N1K1 Kyofu ("Rex") aircraft based in Biwa lake in the Honshū area.

The last A6M2-N in military service was a single example recovered by the French forces in Indochina after the end of World War II. It crashed shortly after being overhauled.

Operators

 Imperial Japanese Navy Air Service
 Yokohama Air Group
 Toko Air Group
 Otsu Air Group
 Yokosuka Air Group (technical evaluation unit)
 11th Air Fleet
 5th Air Fleet
 36th Air Fleet
 452nd Air Fleet
 934th Air Fleet

French Navy - Postwar, one Nakajima A6M-2N was captured in Indo-China, it was impressed into service with the French Navy in late 1945.

Use by Indonesia air forces

Specifications (Nakajima A6M2-N)

See also

References

Bibliography

 Dorr, Robert F. and Chris Bishop. Vietnam Air War Debrief. London:Aerospace |Publishing, 1996. .
 Francillon, R.J. Japanese Aircraft of the Pacific War. London:Putnam, 1970. .
 Green, William. War Planes of the Second World War, Volume Six: Floatplanes. London: Macdonald & Co., (Publishers) Ltd., 1962.
 Green, William and Gordon Swanborough. The Complete Book of Fighters. New York: Smithmark, 1994. .
 Jackson, Robert. Combat Legend: Mitsubishi Zero. Ramsbury, Marlborough, Wiltshire, UK: Airlife Publishing, 2003. .
 Janowicz, Krzystof. Mitsubishi A6M2-N Rufe (Kagero Famous Airplanes 4) (in Polish/English). Lublin, Poland: Kagero, 2004. .
 Mikesh, Robert C. Warbird History: Zero, Combat & Development History of Japan's Legendary Mitsubishi A6M Zero Fighter. Osceola, Wisconsin: Motorbooks International, 1994. .
 Sakaida, Henry. Imperial Japanese Navy Aces, 1937–45. Botley, Oxford, UK: Osprey Publishing Ltd., 1999. .
 Gunston,Bill. The Illustrated Encyclopedia of Combat Aircraft of World War II. London, UK:  Salamander Books Ltd., 1978

External links

Floatplanes
Low-wing aircraft
1940s Japanese military reconnaissance aircraft
Aleutian Islands campaign
A6M2-N
Single-engined tractor aircraft
Aircraft first flown in 1941